The 1977 European Baseball Championship was held in the Netherlands and was won by Italy for the second time in a row. The Netherlands finished as runner-up.

Standings

References
(NL) European Championship Archive at honkbalsite

European Baseball Championship
European Baseball Championship
1977
1977 in Dutch sport